The 2017 Nordic Naturals Challenger was a professional tennis tournament played on hard courts. It was the 30th edition of the tournament which was part of the 2017 ATP Challenger Tour. It took place in Aptos, California, United States between 7 and 13 August 2017.

Singles main-draw entrants

Seeds

 1 Rankings are as of July 31, 2017.

Other entrants
The following players received wildcards into the singles main draw:
  Taylor Fritz
  John Lamble
  Mackenzie McDonald
  Dennis Novikov

The following players received entry into the singles main draw as special exempts:
  Cameron Norrie
  Raymond Sarmiento

The following player received entry into the singles main draw as an alternate:
  Joris De Loore

The following players received entry from the qualifying draw:
  Liam Broady
  Austin Krajicek
  Frederik Nielsen
  Christopher Rungkat

Champions

Singles

  Alexander Bublik def.  Liam Broady 6–2, 6–3.

Doubles

  Jonathan Erlich /  Neal Skupski def.  Alex Bolt /  Jordan Thompson 6–3, 2–6, [10–8].

References

2017 ATP Challenger Tour
2017
2017 in American tennis
2017 in sports in California